is a passenger railway station located in the city of Shikokuchūō, Ehime Prefecture, Japan. It is operated by JR Shikoku and has the station number "Y27".

Lines
Sekigawa Station is served by the JR Shikoku Yosan Line and is located 92.2 km from the beginning of the line at Takamatsu. Yosan line local, Rapid Sunport, and Nanpū Relay services stop at the station.

Layout
The station, which is unstaffed, consists of a side platform serving a single track. There is no station building, only a shelter for waiting passengers. A ramp leads down to the platform from the access road which is at a higher level. A bike shed is located nearby. The station is located on a  siding. A passing line runs parallel and is used by trains which do not stop at the station.

Adjacent stations

History
Japanese National Railways (JNR) opened Sekigawa on 15 April 1961 as a new station on the existing Yosan Line. With the privatization of JNR on 1 April 1987, control of the station passed to JR Shikoku.

Surrounding area
The Seki River, which is the origin of the station name, flows slightly south from the station, and crossing the river leads to Japan National Route 11.

See also
 List of railway stations in Japan

References

External links
Station timetable

Railway stations in Ehime Prefecture
Railway stations in Japan opened in 1961
Shikokuchūō